Leon Martin Conwell  (April 15, 1870 – August 18, 1953) was an  American journalist and politician who served in the Massachusetts House of Representatives and as the nineteenth Mayor, of Somerville, Massachusetts.

Conwell was born April 15, 1870, in  Somerville, Massachusetts to Jennie P. (Hayden) Conwell, and Russell H. Conwell.

Conwell was the publisher and editor of the Somerville Journal.

Notes

1870 births
Princeton University alumni
Republican Party members of the Massachusetts House of Representatives
Mayors of Somerville, Massachusetts
1953 deaths